1844 in philosophy

Events

Publications
 Max Stirner's The Ego and Its Own (predated 1845)
 Søren Kierkegaard's Philosophical Fragments, Prefaces, and The Concept of Anxiety

Births
 October 15 - Friedrich Nietzsche (died 1900)

Deaths

Philosophy
19th-century philosophy
Philosophy by year